Barry (formerly Worcester) is a city in Pike County, Illinois, United States. The population was 1,318 at the 2010 census, down from 1,368 in 2000.

Geography
Barry is located at  (39.694756, -91.040957).

Demographics

2010 census
As of the census of 2010, there were 1,318 people, 545 households, and 341 families living in the city.

2000 census
As of the census of 2000, there were 1,368 people, 552 households, and 363 families living in the city. The racial makeup of the city was 99.42% White, 0.44% Asian, and 0.15% from two or more races. Hispanic or Latino of any race were 0.80% of the population.

There were 552 households, out of which 29.5% had children under the age of 18 living with them, 52.5% were married couples living together, 10.3% had a female householder with no husband present, and 34.2% were non-families. 32.4% of all households were made up of individuals, and 20.3% had someone living alone who was 65 years of age or older. The average household size was 2.32 and the average family size was 2.91.

In the city, the population was spread out, with 23.2% under the age of 18, 7.4% from 18 to 24, 24.3% from 25 to 44, 21.4% from 45 to 64, and 23.8% who were 65 years of age or older. The median age was 41 years. For every 100 females, there were 84.6 males. For every 100 females age 18 and over, there were 79.4 males.

The median income for a household in the city was $27,635, and the median income for a family was $37,143. Males had a median income of $26,607 versus $18,050 for females. The per capita income for the city was $18,097. About 9.2% of families and 11.5% of the population were below the poverty line, including 13.4% of those under age 18 and 14.0% of those age 65 or over.

Notable people

 Floyd Dell, novelist, playwright, poet and literary critic; managing editor (The Masses); born in Barry.
 George Nicol, pitcher and outfielder for the St. Louis Browns, Chicago Colts, Pittsburgh Pirates and Louisville Colonels; born in Barry.
 Lottie Holman O'Neill, state representative; first female member of the General Assembly.
 Cliff Padgett (1879-1951), motorboat builder
 Scott Wike, politician, U.S. Representative, Assistant Secretary of the Treasury to Grover Cleveland; died in Barry

See also
Barry Historic District
Free Frank McWorter Grave Site
New Philadelphia National Historic Site

References

External links
City website

Cities in Pike County, Illinois
Cities in Illinois